The National Guard of Georgia (NG, sak'art'velos erovnuli gvardia) is a branch of the Defense Forces of Georgia. It is tasked with responding to external threats, civil disturbances, and natural disasters. The GNG is also responsible for the mobilization of reservists.

History

Establishment 
The GNG was established on December 20, 1990 after President Zviad Gamsakhurdia ordered the creation of what is now the Defense Forces of Georgia. In January 1991, Soviet President Mikhail Gorbachev, through the chairman of the Supreme Soviet, Anatoly Lukyanov, instructed Gamsakhurdia to ban the creation of the Guard. The official newspaper of the Soviet Army, Krasnaya Zvezda, published a article mocking the National Guard entitled "Mr. Prefects and Mr. Guardsmen." 

The first military parade of the guard with the participation of the First and Second Guards Brigades was held at Boris Paichadze Stadium on 30 April 1991, where for the first time after 70 years, Georgians swore allegiance to their homeland. Gamsakhurdia personally read the oath of allegiance to the guards. The parade was led by Colonel Avtandil Tskitishvili, and saw a small detachment of cavalry being paraded. Colonel Gogi Papavadze (Head of the Main Division of the National Guard) was then presented the new flag of the guard by the parade commander. This day is today commemorated as Armed Forces Day.

Tengiz Kitovani was then appointed as the head of GNG. The GNG was mainly manned by volunteers and more experienced Georgian officers who were serving in Soviet Armies at the time and returned to Georgia to serve in the newly created Georgian Land Forces. Thus, it became the first national military formation in then-Soviet Georgia which would later provide the basis for the regular armed forces.

Early years 
Almost from its birth, the National Guard became directly involved in Georgian politics. In August 1991, soon after its foundation, the GNG was split between supporters of Gamsakhurdia and Kitovani. The split happened after Kitovani announced that the president was about to dissolve the National Guard. Kitovani and his supporters left the barracks and took up positions near Tbilisi. They joined Prime Minister Tengiz Sigua and the paramilitary leader Jaba Ioseliani during the Georgian Civil War which began in December 1991. The remaining parts of the GNG retained their loyalty towards Gamsakhurdia.

Units of the National Guard were a major paramilitary force to have fought in the Georgian Civil War, South Ossetian and Abkhazian conflicts in the early 1990s.

21st century
Following US EUCOM recommendations, new roles, functions, and structure were assigned to the National Guard. As of January 2007, the National Guard of Georgia consisted of 554 veteran personnel.

Commanders 

 Tengiz Kitovani (1990–1992)
 Koba Kobaladze (2001–2004)
Samson Kutateladze (2004 – February 2006)
Akaki Bobokhidze (February–November 2006)
 Nikoloz Janjgava (18 January – December 2007)
Levan Gamkrelidze (until 2017)
Irakli Chumburidze (2017–present)

Structure 

The National Guard of Georgia is composed of:

 Headquarters of the National Guard
 Personnel Department 
 Intelligence Department
 Operational Planning Department
 Logistics Department
 Strategic Planning Department
 Civil Defense Service
 Staff Company
 Security Company
 1st Infantry Brigade (Senaki) (Reserve)
 2nd Infantry Brigade (Telavi) (Reserve)
 Honour Guard Company
 Military Band of the National Guard

Missions 

The main missions of National Guard are:

 Support civil government in crisis situations (natural, technological, ecological);
 Register mobilization resources, study and deliver;
 Convene, select and man of citizens on the basis of the agreement, for the units, subunits and bases of the Armed Forces;
 Provide ceremonial activities through the Guard of Honour and the military band.

See also 
 Georgian Armed Forces
 National Guard
 Ministry of Defense of Georgia
 Military Band of the National Guard of Georgia

References

External links

 The National Guard website

Military of Georgia (country)
Military units and formations of Georgia (country)
Military units and formations established in 1990
1990 establishments in Georgia (country)